The 2012 United States House of Representatives elections in Ohio were held on Tuesday, November 6, 2012 to elect the 16 U.S. representatives from the state of Ohio, a loss of two seats following the 2010 United States Census. The elections coincided with the elections of other federal and state offices, including a quadrennial presidential election and an election to the U.S. Senate.

Overview

By district
Results of the 2012 United States House of Representatives elections in Ohio by district:

Redistricting
The redistricting process was formally begun by a legislative panel on June 16, 2011. A proposal released in September 2011 would create 12 districts favoring Republicans and four which favored Democrats. In the proposal, one district which favored Republicans would be effectively eliminated, and the homes of six of the state's incumbents would be drawn into districts also containing the homes of other incumbents. The map was passed by the Ohio House of Representatives on September 15 and by the Ohio Senate on September 21. The bill passed by the Senate included an appropriations provision intended to prevent the bill from being placed on the 2012 ballot by petition and was passed again by the House the same day. Governor John Kasich signed the bill into law on September 26.

On September 28, the Ohio Democratic Party had filed suit in the Ohio Supreme Court, seeking a ruling on the legality of the Senate's addition of an appropriations provision. On October 14, the Supreme Court ruled that a referendum on the map could go ahead. Ohioans for Fair Districts, the group calling for a referendum, asked the court to restart the 90-day time limit for the collection of signatures; a request the court declined, meaning the 90-day period would begin on September 26 rather than October 14. Chris Redfern, the chair of the Ohio Democratic Party, vowed to collect enough signatures to place the map on the ballot.

If the map had received 66 votes in the House of Representatives, an emergency clause preventing a referendum from being held would have been invoked. As a result, in October 2011 Republicans sought the support of African American Democrats for an alternative map. Later that month members of the Ohio Legislative Black Caucus met with Redfern, indicating they would not immediately seek to compromise with Republicans; however on October 31 Bob Bennett, the former chair of the Ohio Republican Party appointed by House Speaker William G. Batchelder to negotiate an alternative map, said he thought the two parties were close to reaching an agreement.

On November 3, Batchelder brought a slightly modified map to the floor of the House of Representatives. However, the House fell eight votes short of the 66 needed to bring the map up for a vote without a committee hearing having been held.

Later in November, Ohio Democratic Party communications director Seth Bringman said the referendum effort had surpassed 100,000 signatures and aimed to have collected the over 230,000 signatures necessary by December 23. However, a lack of funds prevented Ohioans for Fair Districts from hiring professional signature gatherers and necessitated the exclusive use of volunteers. Redfern said in December 2011 that Democrats might return to the Supreme Court to request that it reconsider its decision on the 90-day time limit. If the signature-gathering effort had failed, an amendment to the Ohio Constitution requiring compact and competitive districts could have been sought. If the Democratic Party failed to collect enough signatures, the original map would have taken effect on Christmas Day 2011.

On December 14, 2011, the House of Representatives and Senate both passed a new map, effectively resolving the situation.

District 1
The Ohio's 1st congressional district is based in Cincinnati, stretching southwestward to Ohio's borders with Kentucky and Indiana. After redistricting, it lost parts of Hamilton County and gained strongly republican Warren Country. This turned it from a district that was 1 percentage point more Democratic than the national average, to one that was 6 percentage points more Republican than the national average. It has been represented by Republican Steve Chabot, who previously served from 1995 until 2009, since January 2011. Chabot sought re-election in 2012.

Republican primary

Candidates

Nominee
Steve Chabot, incumbent U.S. Representative

Primary results

Democratic primary

Candidates

Nominee 
Jeff Sinnard, engineering consultant and candidate for Ohio's 2nd congressional district in 2005 and 2006

Eliminated in primary
Malcolm Kantzler, businessman

Withdrew
Eric Wilson

Declined
Steve Driehaus, former U.S. Representative
Mark Mallory, Mayor of Cincinnati
Connie Pillich, state representative

Primary results

Jeff Sinnard defeated Malcolm Kantzler by a scant 56 votes for the Democratic nomination (the reference footnote 19 provides only the unofficial, election night final tally).

Libertarian primary

Candidates

Nominee 
Jim Berns, former Chair of Hamilton County Libertarian Party and nominee for this district in 2010

Eliminated in primary
Queen Noble, business owner

Primary results

Green primary

Candidates

Nominee 
Rich Stevenson, political writer, activist and nominee for this district in 2010

Primary results

General election

Campaign
The Sinnard campaign was criticized for it's lack of active campaigning and for not even having a campaign website. Sinnard subsequently admitted he was just doing the party a favor by putting his name on the ballot.

Endorsements

Results

District 2
Republican Jean Schmidt had represented Ohio's 2nd congressional district since 2005.

Republican primary

Candidates

Nominee
Brad Wenstrup, podiatrist, U.S. Army veteran and candidate for mayor of Cincinnati in 2009;

Eliminated in primary
Tony Brush, businessman 
Fred Kundrata, Air Force Veteran
Jean Schmidt, incumbent U.S. Representative

Disqualified
Joe Green, businessman (ran as a write-in candidate)

Primary results

Wenstrup upset Schmidt to win the nomination.

Democratic primary

Candidates

Nominee 
William R. Smith, truck driver

Eliminated in primary
David Krikorian, businessman and candidate for this seat in 2008 and 2010.

Declined
Connie Pillich, state representative

Primary results

Krikorian said in October 2011 that if he did not receive the support of the Democratic Party he would run as an independent candidate but did not.

General election

Endorsements

Results

District 3
The new 3rd district is based in Columbus. Redistricting placed most of the heavily Democratic portions of Columbus into the 3rd, with much of the rest of Columbus split into the more Republican 12th and 15th districts thus recreating a snowflake shaped district that fractured Columbus.

Democratic primary

Candidates

Nominee 
Joyce Beatty, vice president of Ohio State University and former minority leader of the Ohio House of Representatives,

Eliminated in primary
Ted Celeste, state representative 
Mary Jo Kilroy, former U.S. Representative 
Priscilla R. Tyson, Columbus city council member

Declined
Kevin Boyce, former State Treasurer 
Michael Coleman, Mayor of Columbus
Paula Brooks, member of Franklin County Board of Commissioners and nominee for the 12th district in 2010 
Jennifer Brunner, former Ohio Secretary of State 
John Patrick Carney, state representative; 
Nancy Garland, state representative; 
Andrew Ginther, president of the Columbus city council; 
Zach Klein, member of the Columbus City Council; 
John O'Grady, Franklin County Commissioner
Charleta Tavares, state senator

Primary results

Republican primary

Candidates

Nominee 
Chris Long, member of the Reynoldsburg city council

Eliminated in primary
John Adams, manufacturing company owner

Primary results

Libertarian primary

Candidates

Nominee
Richard Ehrbar

Primary results

Green primary

Candidates

Nominee
Bob Fitrakis, professor

Primary results

General election

Endorsements

Results

District 4
Republican Jim Jordan has represented Ohio's 4th congressional district since 2007. Jordan sought re-election in 2012.

Republican primary

Candidates

Nominee
Jim Jordan, incumbent U.S. Representative

Primary results

Democratic primary

Candidates

Nominee
Jim Slone, former General Motors employee

Primary results

Libertarian primary

Candidates

Nominee
Chris Kalla

Primary results

General election

Endorsements

Results

District 5
Republican Bob Latta, who has represented Ohio's 5th congressional district since 2007, sought re-election in 2012. He defeated Robert Wallis in the Republican primary.

Republican primary

Candidates

Nominee
Bob Latta, incumbent U.S. Representative

Eliminated in primary
Robert Wallis, business owner and candidate for this seat in 2010

Primary results

Democratic primary

Candidates

Nominee
Angela Zimmann, pastor and professor

Primary results

Libertarian primary

Candidates

Nominee
Eric Eberly

Primary results

General election

Endorsements

Results

District 6
The 6th district encompasses Appalachian Ohio, including Steubenville, Marietta, and Ironton. Republican Bill Johnson, who has represented Ohio's 6th congressional district since January 2011, sought re-election in 2012. He defeated Victor Smith in the Republican primary.

Republican primary

Candidates

Nominee
Bill Johnson, incumbent U.S. Representative

Eliminated in primary
Victor Smith

Primary results

Democratic primary

Candidates

Nominee
Charlie Wilson, former U.S. Representative

Eliminated in primary
Cas Adulewicz

Declined
John Boccieri, former U.S. Representative
Zack Space, former U.S. Representative

Primary results

General election

Endorsements

Polling

Predictions

Results

District 7
Republican Bob Gibbs, who has represented Ohio's 18th congressional district since January 2011, won the Republican nomination in the new 7th district. He defeated pastor Hombre Liggett.

Republican primary

Candidates

Nominee
Bob Gibbs, incumbent U.S. Representative

Eliminated in primary
Hombre Liggett

Primary results

Democratic primary
Joseph Liolios had planned to run, but failed to refile after the Ohio General Assembly modified some districts' boundaries and moved the date of the primary.

Political consultant Bill Burges suggested in September 2011 that Democratic U.S. Representative Betty Sutton, who has represented the 13th district since 2007, may seek re-election in the 7th district; however in December 2011 she announced plans to run in the 16th district.

Candidates

Nominee
Joyce Healy-Abrams, businesswoman and sister of Canton mayor William J. Healy II

Declined
John Boccieri, former U.S. Representative 
Zack Space, former U.S. Representative
Betty Sutton, incumbent U.S. Representative for the 13th district

Primary results

General election

Endorsements

Polling

 With Generic Democratic

Predictions

Results

District 8
Ohio's 8th congressional district has been represented by Republican John Boehner, the Speaker of the House, since 1991. Boehner sought re-election in 2012.

No Democrat filed to challenge Boehner.

Republican primary

Candidates

Nominee
John Boehner, incumbent U.S. Representative

Eliminated in primary
David Lewis, pro-life and Tea Party activist

Primary results

General election

Endorsements

Results

District 9
Democratic U.S. Representatives Marcy Kaptur, who has represented Ohio's 9th congressional district since 1983; and Dennis Kucinich, who represented Ohio's 10th congressional district from 1997 until January 3, 2013 and had considered seeking re-election in Washington or in the 11th district, sought re-election in the 9th district.

Both Democratic and Republican primaries were held on March 6, 2012.

Democratic primary

Candidates

Nominee
Marcy Kaptur, incumbent U.S. Representative

Eliminated in primary
Dennis Kucinich, incumbent U.S. Representative for the 10th district, former mayor of Cleveland, candidate for Secretary of State in 1982, and candidate for President of the United States in 2004 and 2008
Graham Veysey, video production manager

Primary results

Republican primary

Candidates

Nominee
Samuel Wurzelbacher, plumber

Eliminated in primary
Steven Kraus, auctioneer

Declined
Rich Iott, former grocery executive and nominee for this district in 2010

Primary results

Libertarian primary

Candidates

Nominee
Sean Stipe

Primary results

General election

Endorsements

Predictions

Results

District 10
Republican U.S. Representative Mike Turner, who has represented Ohio's 3rd congressional district since 2003, sought re-election in the new 10th district in 2012.

Republican primary

Candidates

Nominee
Mike Turner, incumbent U.S. Representative

Eliminated in primary
John D. Anderson, civilian air force acquisition logistics and sustainment manager
Edward Breen, substitute teacher

Withdrawn
Robert Frost, chair of the Cuyahoga County Republican Party

Declined
Steve Austria, incumbent U.S. Representative for the 7th district

Primary results

Democratic primary
Six candidates qualified for the ballot in the Democratic primary. Sharen Neuhardt won the March primary with a plurality of 36% of the vote. She had in 2008 run for the seat held by Steve Austria, who defeated her 58%-42% in a district McCain won 54%-45%, thus underperforming Obama by three points. However, this redrawn district McCain would have won 50%-49%.

Candidates

Nominee
Sharen Neuhardt, attorney and nominee for the 7th district in 2008

Eliminated in primary
David Esrati
Olivia Freeman, Army veteran
Tom McMasters
Ryan Steele
Mack Vanallen, retired school teacher

Withdrawn
Michael Gardner
Richard Scott Wharton

Primary results

Libertarian primary

Candidates

Nominee
David Harlow

Primary results

General election

Endorsements

Results

District 11
Ohio's 11th congressional district has been represented by Democrat Marcia Fudge since 2008. Fudge sought re-election in 2012.

Democratic primary

Candidates

Nominee
Marcia Fudge, incumbent U.S. Representative

Eliminated in primary
Gerald Henley, former member of the Cleveland school board and independent candidate for Cuyahoga County Council in 2010
Isaac Powell, candidate for this seat in 2008 and 2010

Declined
Dennis Kucinich, incumbent U.S. Representative for the 10th district, former mayor of Cleveland, candidate for Secretary of State in 1982, and candidate for President of the United States in 2004 and 2008 (Running in the 9th district)
Marie Jefferson
Linda Omobien, Akron city council member 
Marco Sommerville, president of the Akron city council
Vernon Sykes state representative 
Nina Turner, state senator
Mike Williams, Akron city council member

Primary results

General election

Endorsements

Results

District 12
Ohio's 12th congressional district has been represented by Republican Pat Tiberi since 2001. Tiberi sought re-election in 2012.

Republican primary

Candidates

Nominee
Pat Tiberi, incumbent U.S. Representative

Eliminated in primary
William Yarbrough

Primary results

Democratic primary

Candidates

Nominee
James Reese, attorney

Eliminated in primary
Doug Litt, employee of Spherion Staffing at Gorman-Rupp and nominee for the 4th district in 2010; and

Primary results

General election

Endorsements

Results

District 13
Democrat Betty Sutton, who has represented Ohio's 13th congressional district since 2007, sought re-election in the new 16th district in 2012. Tim Ryan, who has represented the now-defunct 17th district since 2003, ran unopposed for the Democratic nomination in the new 13th district.

Democratic primary
John Stephen Luchansky and Lisa Regula Meyer had also filed to seek the Democratic nomination, however both failed to refile after the Ohio General Assembly modified some districts' boundaries and moved the date of the primary.

Candidates

Nominee
Tim Ryan, incumbent U.S. Representative

Primary results

Republican primary

Candidates

Nominee
Marisha Agana, Pediatrician

Primary results

General election

Endorsements

Results

District 14
Republican Steve LaTourette, who had represented Ohio's 14th congressional district since 1995, was expected to seek re-election and ran unopposed in the party primary

Republican primary

Candidates

Nominee
Steve LaTourette, incumbent U.S. Representative

Primary results

However LaTourette announced on July 31, 2012 that he was retiring at the end of the term. He officially withdrew from the ballot on August 8, allowing the party chairmen from the seven counties in the district to select a replacement nominee.

Replacement Nominee
David Joyce, Geauga County Prosecutor

Other possible replacements that had been mentioned include Willoughby-Eastlake School Board member Paul Brickner; former state Senator Kevin Coughlin; Lake County Judge Vince Culotta; former state Representative Matt Dolan; former state Senator Tim Grendell; state Senator Frank LaRose; Cuyahoga County Councilman Jack Schron; and, state Representative Ron Young.

Democratic primary

Candidates

Nominee
Dale Virgil Blanchard, accountant and perennial candidate

Primary results

Green primary
Elaine Mastromatteo

Primary results

Libertarian primary
David Macko

Primary results

General election

Endorsements

Results

District 15
Republican Steve Stivers, who has represented Ohio's 15th congressional district since January 2011, sought re-election in 2012.

Republican primary

Candidates

Nominee
Steve Stivers, incumbent U.S. Representative

Eliminated in primary
Ralph Applegate
Charles Chope

Primary results

Democratic primary

Candidates

Nominee
Pat Lang, Athens city law director

Eliminated in primary
Scott Wharton, farmer and pilot

Primary results

General election

Endorsements

Results

District 16
Ohio's 16th congressional district has been represented by Republican Jim Renacci since January 2011. Renacci sought re-election 2012.

Republican primary

Candidates

Nominee
Jim Renacci, incumbent U.S. Representative

Primary results

Democratic primary

Candidates

Nominee
Betty Sutton, incumbent U.S. Representative for the 13th district

Declined
John Boccieri, former U.S. Representative 
Zack Space, former U.S. Representative

Primary results

Candidates

Nominee
Jeffrey Blevins, restaurant manager and nominee for this seat in 2010 (withdrew August 23, 2012)

Primary results

General election

Endorsements

Polling

Debates
Complete video of debate, October 10, 2012

Predictions

Results

References

External links
Elections from the Ohio Secretary of State
United States House of Representatives elections in Ohio, 2012 at Ballotpedia
Ohio U.S. House at OurCampaigns.com
Campaign contributions for U.S. Congressional races in Ohio at OpenSecrets
Outside spending at the Sunlight Foundation

Ohio
2012
2012 Ohio elections